Stiefbeen en zoon was a Dutch sitcom television series that ran on the NCRV television network from January 14, 1963, to March 25, 1977. It was based on the British sitcom Steptoe and Son, which initially aired on BBC One in the United Kingdom from 1962 to 1974. The series was awarded the very first Golden Televizier Ring in 1964.

References

External links
 

1963 Dutch television series debuts
1971 Dutch television series endings
Dutch-language television shows
Black-and-white Dutch television shows
Television shows set in the Netherlands
Dutch comedy television series
Dutch television series based on British television series
Steptoe and Son
Television duos
Fictional duos